The arrondissement of Aurillac is an arrondissement of France in the Cantal department in the Auvergne-Rhône-Alpes region. It has 93 communes.

Composition 

The communes of the arrondissement of Aurillac, and their INSEE codes, are:
 
 Arnac (15011)
 Arpajon-sur-Cère (15012)
 Aurillac (15014)
 Ayrens (15016)
 Badailhac (15017)
 Besse (15269)
 Boisset (15021)
 Carlat (15028)
 Cassaniouze (15029)
 Cayrols (15030)
 Crandelles (15056)
 Cros-de-Montvert (15057)
 Cros-de-Ronesque (15058)
 Freix-Anglards (15072)
 Giou-de-Mamou (15074)
 Girgols (15075)
 Glénat (15076)
 Jou-sous-Monjou (15081)
 Junhac (15082)
 Jussac (15083)
 Labesserette (15084)
 Labrousse (15085)
 Lacapelle-Viescamp (15088)
 Lacapelle-del-Fraisse (15087)
 Ladinhac (15089)
 Lafeuillade-en-Vézie (15090)
 Lapeyrugue (15093)
 Laroquebrou (15094)
 Laroquevieille (15095)
 Lascelle (15096)
 Leucamp (15103)
 Leynhac (15104)
 Mandailles-Saint-Julien (15113)
 Marcolès (15117)
 Marmanhac (15118)
 Maurs (15122)
 Montmurat (15133)
 Montsalvy (15134)
 Montvert (15135)
 Naucelles (15140)
 Nieudan (15143)
 Omps (15144)
 Pailherols (15146)
 Parlan (15147)
 Polminhac (15154)
 Prunet (15156)
 Puycapel (15027)
 Quézac (15157)
 Raulhac (15159)
 Reilhac (15160)
 Roannes-Saint-Mary (15163)
 Rouffiac (15165)
 Le Rouget-Pers (15268)
 Roumégoux (15166)
 Rouziers (15167)
 Saint-Antoine (15172)
 Saint-Cernin (15175)
 Saint-Cirgues-de-Jordanne (15178)
 Saint-Cirgues-de-Malbert (15179)
 Saint-Clément (15180)
 Saint-Constant-Fournoulès (15181)
 Saint-Étienne-Cantalès (15182)
 Saint-Étienne-de-Carlat (15183)
 Saint-Étienne-de-Maurs (15184)
 Saint-Gérons (15189)
 Saint-Illide (15191)
 Saint-Jacques-des-Blats (15192)
 Saint-Julien-de-Toursac (15194)
 Saint-Mamet-la-Salvetat (15196)
 Saint-Paul-des-Landes (15204)
 Saint-Santin-Cantalès (15211)
 Saint-Santin-de-Maurs (15212)
 Saint-Saury (15214)
 Saint-Simon (15215)
 Saint-Victor (15217)
 Sansac-Veinazès (15222)
 Sansac-de-Marmiesse (15221)
 La Ségalassière (15224)
 Sénezergues (15226)
 Siran (15228)
 Teissières-de-Cornet (15233)
 Teissières-lès-Bouliès (15234)
 Thiézac (15236)
 Tournemire (15238)
 Le Trioulou (15242)
 Velzic (15252)
 Vézac (15255)
 Vezels-Roussy (15257)
 Vic-sur-Cère (15258)
 Vieillevie (15260)
 Vitrac (15264)
 Yolet (15266)
 Ytrac (15267)

History

The arrondissement of Aurillac was created in 1800.

As a result of the reorganisation of the cantons of France which came into effect in 2015, the borders of the cantons are no longer related to the borders of the arrondissements. The cantons of the arrondissement of Aurillac were, as of January 2015:

 Arpajon-sur-Cère
 Aurillac-1
 Aurillac-2
 Aurillac-3
 Aurillac-4
 Jussac
 Laroquebrou
 Maurs
 Montsalvy
 Saint-Cernin
 Saint-Mamet-la-Salvetat
 Vic-sur-Cère

References

Aurillac